Eppers is a surname. Notable people with the surname include:

Charles Eppers (1919–1999), American politician from Iowa
Otto Eppers (1893–1955), American cartoonist and illustrator

See also
Epperly (disambiguation)
Epper (surname)